Annai may refer to:

 Annai, Guyana, a small village in the Upper Takutu-Upper Essequibo Region of Guyana
 Annai (2000 film), a Tamil film
 Annai (1962 film), a Tamil film
 Annai Velankanni, a 1971 Tamil film

See also 
 Our Lady of Good Health, a celebrated Catholic title of the Blessed Virgin Mary, also known as Annai Velankanni